Plumeria clusioides is a species of the genus Plumeria in the family Apocynaceae. It is endemic to the Island of Cuba.

References

clusioides
Trees of Cuba
Plants described in 1866